Sean Miller (born 1968) is an American basketball coach.

Sean, Shaun or Shawn Miller may also refer to:
Sean Miller (South of Nowhere), fictional TV character from South of Nowhere
Shaun Miller (born 1987), English footballer
Shawn Miller (American football) (born 1961), former American football player
Shawn Miller (boxer) (born 1982), American boxer